Tapejaromorpha is a group of pterosaurs within the clade Azhdarchoidea. The fossil remains of tapejaromorphs dated back to the Cretaceous period.

The Tapejaromorpha was defined in 2014 by Andres and colleagues. They made Tapejaromorpha the most inclusive clade containing Tapejara but not Quetzalcoatlus. Martill and Naish had previously proposed this same definition for Tapejaridae, but did not formalize it. Andres and colleagues instead defined Tapejaridae more narrowly, as the clade Tapejara + Sinopterus.

References